IMG Artists LLC is a performing arts management corporation.

History
In 1979 Charles Hamlen and Edna Landau co-founded Hamlen/Landau, a New York-based musical artist management agency.

In 1984 it was acquired by International Management Group and renamed IMG Artists.

In September 2003, entrepreneur Barrett Wissman purchased a majority stake of IMG Artists. The company remains focussed on management for musicians, dance companies, orchestras, and attractions, as well as consulting and advisory work for independent clients, arts institutions, concert halls, and culturally engaged corporations.

IMG Artists has corporate offices located in New York, Los Angeles, London, Paris, Hannover, Lucca and Singapore.

External links 

IMG World

Talent agencies
Music managers
Entertainment companies based in California
Entertainment companies based in New York City
American companies established in 1979
Entertainment companies established in 1979